Sir Arthur Brooke, 1st Baronet PC (Ire) (1726 – 7 March 1785) was an Irish baronet and politician.

He was the son of Henry Brooke and his wife Lettice Burton, daughter of Benjamin Burton. Brooke was educated at Trinity College, Dublin  and graduated with a Bachelor of Arts in 1746. He was appointed High Sheriff of Fermanagh in 1752, and became later Governor of County Fermanagh. In 1761, Brooke was elected to the Irish House of Commons for Fermanagh, a seat he held until 1783. Subsequently, he represented Maryborough until his death in 1785. On 3 January 1764, he was created a baronet, of Colebrooke, in the County of Fermanagh and on 15 May 1770, he was invested to the Privy Council of Ireland.

Marriages and children
On 6 August 1751, he married firstly Margaret Fortescue, daughter of Thomas Fortescue and Elizabeth Hamilton. She died in 1756, and Brooke married secondly Elizabeth Foorde at The Palace in Clogher on 21 September 1775. By his first wife, he had two daughters and two sons. Brooke died on Sackville Street (Dublin). His sons having predeceased him, the baronetcy became extinct. His eldest daughter, Selina Elizabeth Brooke, married Thomas Vesey, 1st Viscount de Vesci. His younger daughter, Letitia Charlotte, married Sir John Parnell, 2nd Baronet: they were the parents of Henry Parnell, 1st Baron Congleton, and ancestors of the leading Irish statesman Charles Stewart Parnell.

References

1726 births
1785 deaths
Alumni of Trinity College Dublin
Baronets in the Baronetage of Ireland
High Sheriffs of County Fermanagh
Irish MPs 1761–1768
Irish MPs 1769–1776
Irish MPs 1776–1783
Irish MPs 1783–1790
Members of the Parliament of Ireland (pre-1801) for County Fermanagh constituencies
Members of the Privy Council of Ireland
Members of the Parliament of Ireland (pre-1801) for Queen's County constituencies